Ravnica is a settlement in the Municipality of Radovljica in the Upper Carniola region of Slovenia.

Name
The name of the settlement was changed from Mošnja to Ravnica in 1955.

References

External links

Ravnica at Geopedia

Populated places in the Municipality of Radovljica